XEPOP-AM is a radio station in Puebla, Puebla. It broadcasts Radio Fórmula on 1120 kHz and is owned by Cincoradio.

History
XEPOP received its concession on April 4, 1974. It was owned by Sergio Fajardo Ortiz and broadcast on 1490 kHz. XEPOP was sold to XEPOP, S.A., in 1988.

Joint ownership in the concessionaire is held by María Elvira del Coral Castillo Zepeda and Pablo Cañedo Castillo.

References

News and talk radio stations in Mexico
Radio stations in Puebla
Spanish-language radio stations
Mass media in Puebla (city)
1974 establishments in Mexico
Radio stations established in 1974